Suriname competed at the 2016 Summer Olympics in Rio de Janeiro, Brazil, from 5 to 21 August 2016. This was the nation's thirteenth appearance at the Summer Olympics.

The Suriname Olympic Committee sent a team of six athletes, four men and two women, to compete in four different sports at the Games, matching the nation's roster size with Seoul 1988 and Barcelona 1992. All of them were awarded universality places to compete in their respective sporting events, except for sprinter Jurgen Themen, the lone returning Olympian from London 2012, who qualified directly for the Games on merit. Apart from Thumen, notable athletes on the nation's roster featured swimming stalwart Renzo Tjon A Joe (men's 50 m freestyle) and badminton player Soren Opti, who was selected to carry the Surinamese flag in the opening ceremony.

Suriname, however, failed to win a single Olympic medal since the 1988 Summer Olympics in Seoul, where Anthony Nesty became the nation's first ever champion in the men's 100 m butterfly.

Athletics (track and field)
 
Surinamese athletes have so far achieved qualifying standards in the following athletics events (up to a maximum of 3 athletes in each event):

Track & road events

Badminton

Suriname has received an invitation from the Tripartite Commission to send a badminton player in the men's singles event.

Judo
 
Suriname has received an invitation from the Tripartite Commission to send a judoka competing in the men's half-lightweight category (66 kg) to the Olympics, signifying the nation's Olympic return to the sport for the first time since 1988.

Swimming

Suriname has received a Universality invitation from FINA to send two swimmers (one male and one female) to the Olympics.

See also
Suriname at the 2015 Pan American Games

References

External links 
 

Nations at the 2016 Summer Olympics
2016
2016 in Surinamese sport